The Heiligenberg is an estate near the Dutch town of Leusden.

On this hill, then known as Hohorst, bishop Ansfridus of Utrecht founded a small abbey around the year 1000. The abbey was moved to the city of Utrecht around 1030, as St. Paul's Abbey, but the Heiligenberg remained in their possession until 1592.

In 1637, the house became an estate. It was torn down in 1843, after which the currently existing building was erected.

References

Buildings and structures in Utrecht (province)
Leusden